Thida is an unincorporated community in Independence County, Arkansas, United States. Thida has a post office with ZIP code 72165.

References

Unincorporated communities in Independence County, Arkansas
Unincorporated communities in Arkansas